The 1981 Jakarta Anniversary Tournament was held from August 13 to 21 in Jakarta.  Eight teams participated.

Group stage

Group A

Group B 

Note: Indonesia B was Niac Mitra with 5 additional players.

Knockout stage

Semi-finals

Third place play-off

Final 

Trophy shared

Notes

References 
Cruickshank, Mark; Garin, Erik; Herfiyana, Novan; Morrison, Neil; Veroeveren, Piet. "Jakarta Anniversary Tournament 1981". RSSSF.com

1981
1981–82 in Indonesian football
1981 in Asian football
1981–82 in Bulgarian football
1981–82 in Mexican football
1981 in Indonesian sport